Rattlesnake Lake, also known as Sauder Reservoir, is a manmade lake in southern Alberta, Canada.

Attractions 
Golden Sheaf Park, which contains 454 private campsites, is located adjacent to the lake.

References

See also 
List of lakes in Alberta

Lakes of Alberta